Jodie Haydon (born 1978) is an Australian financial services professional and women's advocate. She is the partner of Anthony Albanese, the 31st and current Prime Minister of Australia since 23 May 2022.

Early life and career
Haydon was born in 1978 at Bankstown, Sydney, and grew up on the Central Coast of New South Wales, the daughter of two teachers. She dropped out of university and began a career in superannuation spanning 20 years in banking and finance companies including industry superannuation funds. In February 2022, Haydon was hired in a new position as women's officer, following her role as a union delegate for the NSW Public Service Association.

Personal life
Haydon met Anthony Albanese in March 2020 at a business dinner in Melbourne where he was speaking. They both followed the rugby league team South Sydney Rabbitohs, and lived near each other in Sydney's Inner West. Albanese and his wife of 19 years, Carmel Tebbutt, had separated in 2019. Haydon and Albanese became partners in 2021.

Haydon accompanied Albanese during the 2022 Australian federal election campaign. She subsequently accompanied him on official prime minister's visits to Dubai, Madrid and Paris.

References

1978 births
Anthony Albanese
Australian financial businesspeople
Australian women trade unionists
Living people
People from Sydney